The 2009 North Alabama Lions football team represented the University of North Alabama in the 2009 NCAA Division II football season.

Schedule

References

North Alabama
North Alabama Lions football seasons
Gulf South Conference football champion seasons
North Alabama Lions football